Still Human is a 2018 Hong Kong comedy-drama film directed and written by  in her feature film directorial debut. It stars veteran actor Anthony Wong and Crisel Consunji in her film debut. The film chronicles the relationship between a man using a wheelchair and his Filipina domestic helper. The film had its world premiere at the 15th Hong Kong Asian Film Festival on 6 November 2018 before it was theatrically released on 11 April 2019.

The film received positive critical reception upon release. At the 38th Hong Kong Film Awards, it took home three awards, including Wong's third Best Actor win after 20 years.

Plot 
A paralyzed and hopeless Hong Kong man Leung Cheong-wing meets his new Filipina domestic worker Evelyn Santos, a former nurse who has put her dream of being a photographer on hold and came to the city to earn a living. The two strangers live under the same roof through different seasons, and as they learn more about each other, they also learn more about themselves. Together, they learn about how to face the different seasons of life.

Cast 
 Anthony Wong as Leung Cheong-wing (梁昌榮)
 Crisel Consunji as Evelyn Santos
 Sam Lee as Fai Cheung (張輝)
 Cecilia Yip as Leung Jing-ying (梁晶瑩)

Production 
The Government of Hong Kong runs the First Feature Film Initiative, which funds winners' first feature film. Oliver Chan won the prize in the Higher Education Institution Group in 2017 with Still Human, and was awarded $3.25 million HKD. The film was produced by No Ceiling Film.

Chan sent Anthony Wong an email pitching the film with low expectations, but Wong agreed to take the part with no pay. Consunji auditioned for her role after reading about it in a Facebook ad.

Social impact 
There are over 370,000 foreign domestic helpers, otherwise known as migrant workers, in Hong Kong as of 2017. They mainly come from Indonesia and the Philippines. Their condition has been scrutinised by human rights groups as cases of abuse have been reported, in addition to poor living conditions and treatment from employers, and everyday discrimination. This film is the first in Hong Kong to have a migrant worker as a leading character, and has sparked discussions about their lives in the city.

Accepting Best New Performer at the 38th Hong Kong Film Awards, Crisel Consunji said "in Hong Kong, when we celebrate our diversity, we move forward together", and thanked "all the women who bravely shared with [her] their stories", calling them "modern heroes". She delivered parts of her speech in Cantonese, English and Tagalog.

Awards

Reception

Critical reception
Edmund Lee of the South China Morning Post rated the film 3.5 of 5 stars. Lee praised Oliver Chan and stated that Still Human "is one of those rare gems of a film which takes a distinctly Hong Kong scenario and turns it into a gently comical drama with universal appeal."

Fionnuala Halligan of Screen Daily wrote that Oliver Chan "clearly works well with actors" and praised Consunji's performance.

Justin Lowe of The Hollywood Reporter praised Chan as a writer who "excels at portraying the often precarious lives of overseas Filipino workers with compassion and insight." However, he cited that the main character "Leung's sudden about-face in his treatment of Evelyn represents the narrative’s obvious weak point".

Box office
Still Human grossed HK$19,811,169 at the Hong Kong box office during its theatrical run from 11 April to 3 July 2019, making it the fifth highest-grossing domestic of the year in the territory.

References

External links
 
 

2018 films
Hong Kong comedy-drama films
Winners of the First Feature Film Initiative
2018 comedy-drama films
2018 directorial debut films
2010s Hong Kong films